Suresh Samuel David (born March 22, 1959) is an Indian physician specializing in emergency medicine. The first Indian physician to be formally trained in emergency medicine, David pioneered the practice of emergency medicine in India and is credited with founding the department of emergency medicine at Christian Medical College, Vellore. He is the first person to hold the position of a professor in the discipline of Emergency Medicine in India.

David has published three medical books viz. Handbook of Emergency Medicine, Textbook of Emergency Medicine and Clinical pathways in Emergency Medicine, the former two publications reported to be the first handbook and textbook on emergency medicine by an Indian author. He is a Fellow of the Royal College of Physicians of London and the Australasian College for Emergency Medicine and a recipient of Best Doctor Award of Tamil Nadu Dr. M.G.R. Medical University. He has also received a citation, Leadership in Emergency Medicine, from A. P. J. Abdul Kalam, the former president of India.

Education and career

David, born on 22 March 1959, graduated in medicine (MBBS) from Christian Medical College, Vellore in 1982 and started his career by joining Christian Mission Hospital, Dharapuram, Tamil Nadu. In 1985 he undertook training in general surgery at Madras Medical College, after which he moved to Dr. Somervell Memorial CSI Medical College, a rural secondary level mission hospital in Karakonam. Subsequently, he joined his alma mater, Christian Medical College as a junior lecturer in general surgery and during his service at CMC, he did a three-year advanced training in emergency medicine at Queen Elizabeth Hospital, Adelaide, an Australasian College for Emergency Medicine-accredited institution. On his return to India, he established the department of emergency medicine at CMC in 1994, the first independent department for emergency medicine in India; the department would go on to be recognized as the South Asian Regional Training Centre in Emergency Medicine by the World Health Organization in 2005. When he was appointed as a professor in 2002, he became the first person to hold the position of a professor in emergency medicine in India. He served as a senior consultant and head of emergency department at CMC for 22 years. During this period, he obtained a PhD from the University of Madras in 2013.  He is also associated with All India Institute of Medical Sciences, Delhi as a visiting scientist. In 2017, Professor David was inducted as Principal Assessor by the National Accreditation Board for hospitals (NABH).

Legacy 

David is credited with pioneering the discipline of emergency medicine in India by restructuring the 'casualty' unit into the first independent emergency medicine department at CMC, Vellore in 1994. He headed the department and during his tenure, it evolved into a 45-bedded clinical unit, reported to be the largest of its kind in India in the private sector, tending to about 200 patients a day. The department started the first academic course in emergency medicine in India in 1997 during his tenure. He was instrumental in the introduction of the concept of Trauma Team and triage at CMC. The first of his three books, Handbook of Emergency Medicine was published by Elsevier in 1995, known to be the first handbook published by an Indian author on the subject. His second book, Textbook of Emergency Medicine, a 2380-page 2-volume work composed of 262 chapters contributed by 292 authors, was published in 2011, making it the largest comprehensive textbook of emergency medicine published thus far. The latest of his books, Clinical Pathways in Emergency Medicine, was again a two-volume work spread over 1510 pages, and the book was released in 2016. Besides, he has contributed chapters to books by others and has published over 50 medical papers and articles.

David chaired the scientific committee of SEMICON 2017, an annual conference on emergency medicine organized by Society for Emergency Medicine, India, held at Kochi in March 2017. He is consultant of the World Health Organization for emergency medicine for South-East Asia and is a faculty member of WHO-USAID programs on Disaster Medicine. In the aftermath of the 2004 Indian Ocean earthquake and tsunami, David led a team of 9 volunteers from CMC and reportedly established 18 medical camps in a week's time which provided medical assistance to 2879 people. He was the organizing secretary of the 7th National Conference of Emergency Medicine (EMCON 2005) held in October 2005 at Vellore and is the founder of Network of Emergency Physicians, India (NEPI), a web platform for exchange of information among emergency physician community. He sits in the board of advisors of EMS Leaders Forum and was a member of the three-member panel which designed courses for Hospital Preparedness for Emergencies (HOPE), a USAID-NSET initiative, in 2009. He has delivered several invited speeches or keynote addresses which include National Assembly on Pediatric Emergency Medicine (NAPEM) 2011 and Conclave on Legal and Ethical Challenges in Healthcare Ecosystem of 2017. He has also been associated with medical conferences as a patron or resource person and has participated in continuing medical education programs.

Awards and honors 
David, an honorary fellow of the Australasian College for Emergency Medicine, (2006), and the Royal College of Physicians (2013), has been recognized as a resource person in the field of health care by the East Asia Summit Earthquake Risk Reduction Centre of the National Institute of Disaster Management. Tamil Nadu Dr. M.G.R. Medical University awarded him the Best Doctor Award in 2012. He was awarded Leadership in Emergency Medicine by MMHRC - Institute Of Emergency Medicine at the Regional Conference in Emergency Medicine 2015, the citation presented to him by the former president of India, A.P.J. Abdul Kalam.

Bibliography

Books

Articles 

David SS Divitha S. "The reliability, effectiveness, and epidemiological profile of the Vellore Model of Triage System". in

Notes

References

External links 
 

20th-century Indian medical doctors
Indian medical writers
Academic staff of the All India Institute of Medical Sciences, New Delhi
1959 births
Indian medical academics
Fellows of the Royal College of Physicians
Indian emergency physicians
Living people
Indian healthcare managers